Hussain Habib Al-Hajooj Al-Nakhli (born 16 June 1998) is a Saudi Arabian professional footballer who plays as a winger for Al-Kawkab.

Career
Al-Hajoj he started his career with Al-Ansar. In his debut season with Al-Ansar, he helped get the club promoted to the MS League. Al-Hajoj left Al-Ansar and joined Pro League clubAl-Ittihad on October 28, 2018. On February 6, 2019, Al-Hajoj joined Al-Fayha on a six-month loan. On August 31, 2019, he joined Al-Adalah on a one-year loan. However, his loan was cut short and returned to Al-Ittihad in January 2020. On February 1, 2020, Al-Hajoj joined Al-Raed on a permanent deal. On October 21, 2020, Al-Hajoj joined Najran on loan until the end of the 2020–21 season.

References

External links 
 

1998 births
Living people
Saudi Arabian footballers
Saudi Arabia youth international footballers
Al-Ansar FC (Medina) players
Ittihad FC players
Al-Fayha FC players
Al-Adalah FC players
Al-Raed FC players
Najran SC players
Al-Kawkab FC players
Saudi Second Division players
Saudi First Division League players
Saudi Professional League players
Association football wingers
Saudi Arabian Shia Muslims